Yesterday & Today is the sixth studio album by Japanese band Tokio. It was released on February 2, 2000. It was the last album by Tokio to be released under Sony Music Entertainment. The album reached ninth place on the Oricon weekly chart and charted for three weeks.

Track listing

References 

2000 albums
Tokio (band) albums